Abu Jalal-e Jonubi (also Romanized as Abū Jalāl-e Jonūbī and Abū Jalāl-e Janūbī) is a village in Howmeh-ye Gharbi Rural District, in the Central District of Dasht-e Azadegan County, Khuzestan Province, Iran. At the 2006 census, its population was 72, in 13 families.

References 

Populated places in Dasht-e Azadegan County